Howard Marine and Dredging Co Ltd v A Ogden & Sons (Excavations) Ltd [1978] QB 574 is an English contract law case, concerning misrepresentation. It explains the test of "reasonable grounds for belief" under the Misrepresentation Act 1967 s 2(1), and raises the issue of the reasonableness test under s 3.

Facts
Ogden Ltd wanted to hire some barges in order to dump excavated clay at sea. Mr O’Loughlin, Howard Marine Ltd’s employee, told Mr Redpath, Ogden Ltd’s employee that their German built barges could carry 1600 tonnes (deadweight, rather than cubic capacity). This was based on the Lloyd’s Register for barges. Unfortunately and unusually the Lloyd's Register was incorrect. The true capacity was 1055 tonnes. Mr O’Loughlin was aware that the German shipping documents stated the correct figure of 1055 tonnes. But he preferred the Lloyd’s Register. The charterparties (a contract for the hire of a ship) said Ogden Ltd’s acceptance of the barges showed they were in every way satisfied. When the barges proved to be insufficient for the job, Ogden Ltd refused to pay the full price. Howard Marine Ltd terminated the agreement and sued for the outstanding payments. Ogden Ltd counterclaimed for,

breach of collateral warranty
breach of duty under s 2(1) MA 1967
negligent misstatement under Hedley Byrne

Howard Marine Ltd argued they had reasonable grounds to believe their false statement, because the Lloyd's Register was the ‘bible’.

Judgement
The Court of Appeal (Lord Denning MR, Bridge LJ and Shaw LJ) all held there was no breach of warranty, but decided by a majority that Howard Marine Ltd was liable for breach of duty under MA 1967 s 2(1). It was not necessary, therefore, to decide the Hedley Byrne point, but each judge said something different.

Under MA 1967 s 2(1) Bridge LJ noted Howard Marine Ltd had to prove a reasonable ground to believe what he said about the barge’s capacity.

Bridge LJ said Mr O’Loughlin was always honest, but his eagerness to prefer the Register over the documents was not reasonable. They held liability had not been validly excluded, because in agreement with the judge he felt that it did not pass the reasonableness test under MA 1967 s 3. Shaw LJ agreed.

Lord Denning MR dissented saying that there were reasonable grounds to prefer the Lloyd’s Register. He also argued that the exclusion clause was valid, and was reasonable.

See also

English contract law
Misrepresentation in English law

Notes

English misrepresentation case law
Lord Denning cases
1978 in British law
Court of Appeal (England and Wales) cases
1978 in case law